M. Badruddin Ajmal (born 12 February 1950) is an Indian businessman, politician, philanthropist and Islamic theologian from the state of Assam. He is the state-president of Jamiat Ulama-e-Hind for Assam. He is the incumbent MP from Dhubri constituency.

Biography
Ajmal was born on 12 February 1950 to a Bengali Muslim family from Hojai in central Assam. His family traces their origins to the Sylhet district of eastern Bengal. He is the son of Haji Ajmal Ali, a rice farmer who moved to Mumbai in 1950 to try to succeed in the perfume industry using the oud plant. After the opening of the first store in the 1960s, the Ajmal perfume brand quickly grew to become a large brand in the Middle East.

He holds master's degrees in Theology and Arabic from Darul Uloom Deoband.

Career 
The son of the founder of Ajmal Perfumes, he established the All India United Democratic Front (AIUDF) in 2005. He is also the president of the Assam State Jamiat Ulema-e-Hind. He is a three-time MP from Dhubri constituency. He has been regularly listed among "The 500 Most Influential Muslims" of the world.

He is the managing trustee of Haji Abdul Majid Memorial (HAMM) Public Trust, Hojai. This trust is best known for the charitable hospital Haji Abdul Majid Memorial Hospital and Research Center at Hojai, Assam. He also established a hospital at Malua near Badarpur of Karimganj, named as Badarpur Hospital. In 2005, he established Ajmal Foundation, a non-governmental organization based in Assam, India, and operating 25 educational institutions across the state.

Political activities
He was the president of Hojai session reception committee of Assam Sahitya Sabha, 2004 and Darul Hadith, Jayanagar Madrassa. Assam Ajmal's political debut came in 2005 after the Supreme Court struck down the Illegal Migrants (Determination by Tribunal) Act. Ajmal founded the Assam United Democratic Front, which was renamed the All-India United Democratic Front in 2013.

Before the 2006 Assam assembly elections, Ajmal was politically insignificant. During the 2006 elections however, his party managed to win 10 seats fighting the Congress. he was elected simultaneously from two constituencies – South Salmara and Jamunamukh – by a large margin of votes. In the 2009 Lok Sabha elections, Ajmal won from Dhubri constituency.

In the 2011 Assembly polls, AIUDF won 18 seats and emerged as the largest opposition party in Assam.

In the 2014 Lok Sabha polls, Ajmal was re-elected from Dhubri and his party won 3 Lok Sabha seats. In the 2016 assembly elections, however, the BJP swept the polls and Ajmal himself lost the Salmara South constituency. His party was reduced to 13 seats.

In the 2019 Lok Sabha elections, Ajmal was the only candidate from his party to keep his seat, winning again from Dhubri. With 7 children, he has most children for any Member of Parliament in India. In 2020, Ajmal announced he and Congress would be in alliance for the 2021 polls.

Controversy 
Ajmal's statements have often courted controversy for polarizing Bengali Muslims. Following the 2012 Assam riots, Ajmal claimed the violence was between Bodos and Muslims. The remarks were criticised by an Assamese Muslim group, the Sadou Asom Gariya – Moria Desi (SAGMJ), along with the All Assam Students Union, for ignoring that Assamese Muslims were not involved at all.

On 22 January 2021, at a rally in Dhubri, Ajmal claimed the BJP had a list of 3500 mosques it would destroy if returned to power at the Centre and that “they will not let women go out wearing ‘burqa’, grow a beard, wear a skullcap or even offer azaan at mosques.” The BJP claimed he was making "communal statements" out of "nervousness" since BJP "will get majority share of Muslim votes" this election. Congress, with whom Ajmal is in alliance, as well as NDA party Asom Gana Parishad also condemned the remarks.

References

External links
 

People from Dhubri district
India MPs 2009–2014
Living people
1950 births
21st-century Indian Muslims
Lok Sabha members from Assam
India MPs 2014–2019
All India United Democratic Front politicians
India MPs 2019–present
Indian businesspeople
Darul Uloom Deoband alumni
21st-century Bengalis
20th-century Bengalis